Second Samurai is a video game. It is the sequel to the 1991 game First Samurai, released for the Amiga in 1993 and ported to the Mega Drive in 1994.

Gameplay
The game includes prehistoric and futuristic levels as well as feudal Japan as in First Samurai. Contact with enemies or falling off the screen (lives are not lost automatically) subtracts one point from the life bar. In the Mega Drive/Genesis version of the game, the Demon King from the first game taunts the player on a black screen when they lose a life with sayings such as "Give up mortal!" and "Going Down!" until the last life is lost.

Development
Following the success of First Samurai, Mev Dinc was interested in developing 'a sequel to end all sequels'. The concept of having 2 samurai to choose from was established early on. Psygnosis put forward an appealing offer for both the Amiga and Sega Mega Drive versions, to which Vivid Image gladly agreed.

Development for the game was going smoothly, and plans were even in place to release a Mega-CD port alongside the Mega Drive version. In 1993 however, Sony acquired Psygnosis as part of their ramp-up for the PlayStation and mandated that existing console projects be cancelled. Vivid Image was able to negotiate a settlement, allowing the release of the Mega Drive version, and a full payout. The Mega-CD version was never released.

Reception

References

External links
 Second Samurai at Lemon Amiga
 Second Samurai at the Hall of Light
 Second Samurai for the Mega Drive at GameFAQs

1993 video games
Amiga games
Cooperative video games
Dinosaurs in video games
Europe-exclusive video games
Japan in non-Japanese culture
Platform games
Psygnosis games
Sega Genesis games
Side-scrolling video games
Video game sequels
Video games about samurai
Video games about time travel
Video games scored by Matt Furniss
Video games set in feudal Japan
Video games set in prehistory
Video games developed in the United Kingdom